Epicrocis albigeralis is a species of snout moth in the genus Epicrocis. It was described by Francis Walker in 1866, and is known from South Africa.

References

Moths described in 1866
Phycitini
Endemic moths of South Africa